Marques Jannie Ackerman (born 1 March 1996) is a South African first-class cricketer. He was included in the North West squad for the 2016 Africa T20 Cup. In August 2017, he was named in Durban Qalandars' squad for the first season of the T20 Global League. However, in October 2017, Cricket South Africa initially postponed the tournament until November 2018, with it being cancelled soon after.

In September 2018, he was named in KwaZulu-Natal's squad for the 2018 Africa T20 Cup. He was the leading run-scorer for KwaZulu-Natal in the tournament, with 121 runs in four matches. He was also the leading run-scorer for KwaZulu-Natal in the 2018–19 CSA 3-Day Provincial Cup, with 439 runs in six matches.

In September 2019, he was named in the squad for the Cape Town Blitz team for the 2019 Mzansi Super League tournament. Later the same month, he was named in KwaZulu-Natal's squad for the 2019–20 CSA Provincial T20 Cup.

In April 2021, he was named in KwaZulu-Natal's squad, ahead of the 2021–22 cricket season in South Africa. In February 2022, Ackerman was named as the captain of the Dolphins for the 2021–22 CSA T20 Challenge.

References

External links
 

1996 births
Living people
Cricketers from Johannesburg
South African cricketers
North West cricketers
Lions cricketers
KwaZulu-Natal cricketers
Dolphins cricketers
Cape Town Blitz cricketers